This is a partial list of rivers in Tasmania, Australia.

 Achilles
 Adams
 Albert
 Andrew
 Anne
 Anthony
 Apsley
 Arm
 Arthur
 Arve
 Badger
 Bird
 Black
 Blackman
 Bluff
 Blythe
 Boyd
 Boyes
 Braddon
 Break O'Day
 Broad
 Browns
 Calder
 Cam
 Carlton
 Cascade
 Clyde
 Cockle
 Collingwood
 Conder
 Cracroft
 Crayfish
 Crossing
 Cygnet
 Davey
 Dee
 Denison
 Derwent
 Detention
 De Witt
 Don
 Donaldson
 Dove
 Duck
 Dukes
 Eldon
 Elizabeth
 Emu
 Flowerdale
 Ford
 Forth
 Frankland (north-west)
 Frankland (south-west)
 Franklin
 Fury
 Gawler
 Gell
 George
 Gordon
 Governor
 Great Forester
 Harcus
 Hardwood
 Hatfield
 Heemskirk
 Hellyer
 Henty
 Hobart
 Holley
 Huon
 Huskisson
 Inglis
 Isis
 Jane
 Jordan
 Julius
 Keith
 King
 Lachlan
 Lake
 Lea
 Leven
 Liffey
 Little Denison
 Little Swanport
 Loddon
 Lora
 Lucan
 Lune
 Lyons
 Mackintosh
 Macquarie
 Marionoak
 Maurice
 Medway
 Meander
 Mersey
 Mountain
 Murchison
 Nelson
 Nile
 Nive
 North Esk
 Old
 Olga
 Orange
 Ouse
 Owen Meredith 
 Paradise
 Pery
 Picton
 Pieman
 Pipers
 Plenty
 Pokana
 Princess
 Que
 Queen
 Rapid
 Ring
 Ringarooma
 Ringarooma (Lower)
 Rubicon
 Russell
 Salmon
 Savage
 Serpentine
 Smith
 Snake
 Solly
 Sophia
 Sorell
 South Eldon
 South Esk
 Southwell
 Spence
 Spero
 Sprent
 Stanley
 Stitt
 St Patricks
 St Pauls
 Styx
 Surprise
 Supply
 Tamar
 Tofft
 Tooms
 Tully
 Tyne
 Wallace
 Wanderer
 Wandle
 Waratah
 Wedge
 Weld
 Welcome
 Whyte
 Wilson
 Wye
 Yolande

See also

 List of rivers of Australia
 Rivers of Tasmania

References

 
Rivers
Tasmania